Alexander Hamilton Vinton (March 30, 1852 – January 18, 1911) was first bishop of the Episcopal Diocese of Western Massachusetts from 1902 to 1911.

Education
Vinton was born on March 30, 1852, in Brooklyn, New York City, the son of David Hammond Vinton and Eliza Arnold. In 1873 he graduated from St Stephen's College in Annandale-on-Hudson, New York. He also studied at the General Theological Seminary and graduated with a Bachelor of Divinity in 1876. Between 1876 and 1877, he studied at Leipzig University, after which he became an ordained deacon on July 11, 1877, and an ordained priest on September 29, 1878.

Priesthood
Vinton served his diaconate as curate of Emmanuel Episcopal Church, Boston from 1869 to 1877. Later, he was appointed rector of Holy Communion Church in Norwood, New Jersey where he served between 1877 and 1878. He transferred to Memorial church Holy Comforter in Philadelphia, Pennsylvania in 1879 and to All Saints Church in Worcester, Massachusetts in 1884.

Episcopacy 
In 1902, Vinton was elected the first Bishop of Western Massachusetts after the diocese was split from the Diocese of Massachusetts in 1901. He was consecrated in All Saints Church in Worcester, Massachusetts on April 22, 1902, by Bishop Thomas Frederick Davies of Michigan. Vinton was elected a member of the American Antiquarian Society in 1903.

References

Bibliographic directory from Project Canterbury

1852 births
1911 deaths
Members of the American Antiquarian Society
19th-century American Episcopalians
Episcopal bishops of Western Massachusetts